Evolution is a collection of short stories that work together to form an episodic science fiction novel by author Stephen Baxter.  It follows 565 million years of human evolution, from shrewlike mammals 65 million years in the past to the ultimate fate of humanity (and its descendants, both biological and non-biological) 500 million years in the future.

Plot summary
The book follows the evolution of mankind as it shapes surviving Purgatorius into tree dwellers, remoulds a group that drifts from Africa to a (then much closer) New World on a raft formed out of debris, and confronting others with a terrible dead end as ice clamps down on Antarctica.

The stream of DNA runs on elsewhere, where ape-like creatures in North Africa are forced out of their diminishing forests to come across grasslands where their distant descendants will later run joyously. At one point, hominids become sapient, and go on to develop technology, including an evolving universal constructor machine that goes to Mars and multiplies, and in an act of global ecophagy  consumes Mars by converting the planet into a mass of machinery that leaves the Solar system in search of new planets to assimilate. Human extinction (or the extinction of human culture) also occurs in the book, as well as the end of planet Earth and the rebirth of life on another planet.  (The extinction-level event that causes the human extinction is, indirectly, an eruption of the Rabaul caldera, coupled with various actions of humans themselves, some of which are only vaguely referred to, but implied to be a form of genetic engineering which removed the ability to reproduce with non-engineered humans.) Also to be found in Evolution are ponderous Romans, sapient dinosaurs, the last of the wild Neanderthals, a primate who witnesses the extinction of the dinosaurs, symbiotic primate-tree relationships, mole people, and primates who live on a Mars-like Earth. The final chapter witnesses the final fate of the last primate and the descendants of the replicator machines sent to Mars that are implied to have reached sentience and colonized the galaxy.
In the epilogue, Joan Useb (a paleontologist introduced in the prologue and in the intermission sections) discusses the philosophy of evolution with her daughter Lucy as they weather the aftermath of Rabaul on the Galapagos, where Charles Darwin made his observations leading to his landmark theory.

Reception
Peter Cannon reviewing for Publishers Weekly stated "here is a rigorously constructed hard SF novel where the question is not whether humanity will reach the stars but how it will survive its own worst tendencies." Kirkus Reviews called this novel "glum, dyspeptic, and depressing." Jackie Cassada said in her review for Library Journal that "spanning more than 165 million years and encompassing the entire planet, Baxter's ambitious saga provides both an exercise in painless paleontology and superb storytelling."

Evolution has been compared to Olaf Stapledon's Last and First Men. Baxter has acknowledged Stapledon's influence.

References

External links

 Lengthy review at http://www.indymedia.ie/article/74240

2002 British novels
Novels by Stephen Baxter
British post-apocalyptic novels
Novels about impact events
Novels about dinosaurs
2002 science fiction novels
2002 short story collections
Books about evolution
Evolution in popular culture
Evolutionary biology literature
Speculative evolution
Fiction about neanderthals
Fiction about dinosaurs
Novels about robots
Novels set on Mars
Apocalyptic novels
Novels set in prehistory
Orion Books books